Webster J. Oliver (January 14, 1888 – November 16, 1969) was a chief judge of the United States Customs Court.

Education and career
Born on January 14, 1888, in Brooklyn, New York, Oliver received a Bachelor of Laws in 1911 from Brooklyn Law School. He worked in private practice from 1912 to 1917 and again from 1919 to 1935. He served as a captain in the United States Army Ordnance Corps from 1917 to 1919. He served as a special attorney for the Customs Division of the United States Department of Justice from 1935 to 1938. He served as Assistant Attorney General of the Customs Division of the United States Department of Justice from 1938 to 1940.

Federal Judicial Service
Oliver was nominated by President Franklin D. Roosevelt on June 11, 1940, to a seat on the United States Customs Court vacated by Judge Charles P. McClelland. He was confirmed by the United States Senate on June 18, 1940, and received his commission on June 24, 1940. He served as Presiding Judge from 1940 to 1965. Oliver was initially appointed as a Judge under Article I, but the court was raised to Article III status by operation of law on July 14, 1956, and Oliver thereafter served as an Article III Judge. He assumed senior status on June 24, 1967. His service terminated on November 16, 1969, due to his death in New York City, New York.

References

Sources
 

1888 births
1969 deaths
Judges of the United States Customs Court
People from Brooklyn
Brooklyn Law School alumni
United States Article I federal judges appointed by Franklin D. Roosevelt
20th-century American judges